In geometry, a mylar balloon is a surface of revolution.  While a sphere is the surface that encloses a maximal volume for a given surface area, the mylar balloon instead maximizes volume for a given generatrix arc length.  It resembles a slightly flattened sphere.

The shape is approximately realized by inflating a physical balloon made of two circular sheets of flexible, inelastic material; for example, a popular type of toy balloon made of aluminized plastic.  Perhaps counterintuitively, the surface area of the inflated balloon is less than the surface area of the circular sheets.  This is due to physical crimping of the surface, which increases near the rim.

"Mylar balloon" is the name for the figure given by W. Paulson, who first investigated the shape.  The term was subsequently adopted by other writers.  "Mylar" is a trademark of DuPont.

Definition 

The positive portion of the generatrix of the balloon is the function z(x) where for a given generatrix length a:

  (i.e.: the generatrix length is given)

 is a maximum  (i.e.: the volume is maximum)

Here, the radius r is determined from the constraints.

Parametric characterization 
The parametric equations for the generatrix of a balloon of radius r are given by:

 

(where E and F are elliptic integrals of the second and first kind)

Measurement 
The "thickness" τ of the balloon (that is, the distance across at the axis of rotation) can be determined by calculating  from the parametric equations above.  The thickness is approximately
 
 τ ≈ 0.599 · 2r.

The ratio of τ to r is independent of the size of the balloon.

The ratio of the generatrix's arc length a to the radius of the balloon is approximately

 a/r ≈ 1.3110. (reference states that "a" is radius of deflated balloon, "r" is radius of inflated balloon)

The volume of the balloon is given by:

 

where a is the arc length of the generatrix).

or alternatively:

 

where τ is the thickness at the axis of rotation

Surface geometry 
The ratio of the principal curvatures at every point on the mylar balloon is exactly 2, making it an interesting case of a Weingarten surface. Moreover, this single property fully characterizes the balloon.  The balloon is evidently flatter at the axis of rotation; this point is actually has zero curvature in any direction.

See also 

 Paper bag problem

References 
 
 
 

Surfaces